Catherine of Brunswick-Lüneburg (1395 – 28 December 1442, Grimma) was a member of the House of Welf, a princess of Brunswick-Lüneburg and by marriage, the Electress of Saxony.

Life 
Catherine was the only daughter and second child of the Duke Henry I of Brunswick-Lüneburg († 1416) from his first marriage to Sophie († June 1400), daughter of Duke Wartislaw VI of Pomerania.

As a 7-year-old she married on 7 February 1402 Margrave Frederick IV "the Warlike" of Meissen (1370–1428), who in 1425 became the first Elector of Saxony, as Frederick I.  The elector lost a large part of his army in the Hussite Wars in a battle in 1425 at Most.  During Frederick's absence, Electress Catherine organized another army of 20,000 men, which rushed to Frederick's aid, but was defeated devastatingly in the Battle of Aussig in 1426.

Catherine spent time with her husband, but more frequently alone, at Mildenstein Castle in Leisnig, which thereby developed into a private residence of the Saxon Electors.

She is buried in the Princely Chapel in Meissen Cathedral.

Offspring 
From her marriage Catherine had the following children:
 Catherine, died young;
 Frederick II, Elector of Saxony (1412 – 1464);
 Sigismund, Bishop of Würzburg, (3 March 1416 – 24 December 1471);
 Anna, (5 June 1420 – 17 September 1462), married to Louis I, Landgrave of Hesse;
 Catherine, (1421 – 23 August 1476, Berlin), married to Frederick II, Elector of Brandenburg;
 Henry, (21 May 1422 – 22 July 1435);
 William III, Duke of Luxemburg (1425 – 1482), Landgrave of Thuringia, Duke of Luxemburg; married
 in 1446, Anne of Austria (1432–1462)
 in 1463, Catherine of Brandenstein († 1492)

References 

 Jens Kunze, The Leisnig district in the 15th Century, p. 191
 General German Real-Encyclopaedia for the educated classes, Volume 5 by FA Brockhaus Verlag Leipzig, p. 633

|-

1395 births
1442 deaths
Catherine
Catherine
Daughters of monarchs